Peter Klepáč (born August 3, 1975) is a Slovak former professional ice hockey defenceman.

Klepáč played in the Tipsport Liga for HC Košice, HK 32 Liptovský Mikuláš, HK Poprad, HKM Zvolen and MHC Martin.

Career statistics

References

External links

1975 births
Living people
Bisons de Neuilly-sur-Marne players
HC Košice players
MHk 32 Liptovský Mikuláš players
MHC Martin players
HK Poprad players
Slovak ice hockey defencemen
Sportspeople from Liptovský Mikuláš
HKM Zvolen players
Expatriate ice hockey players in France
Slovak expatriate sportspeople in France
Slovak expatriate ice hockey people